was a town located in Tagawa District, Fukuoka Prefecture, Japan.

As of 2003, the town had an estimated population of 8,285 and a density of 1,110.59 persons per km². The total area was 7.46 km².

On March 6, 2006, Kanada was merged with the towns of Akaike and Hōjō (all from Tagawa District) to create the town of Fukuchi.

External links
 Fukuchi official website 

Dissolved municipalities of Fukuoka Prefecture
Populated places disestablished in 2006
2006 disestablishments in Japan